Daviesia wyattiana, commonly known as long-leaf bitter-pea, is a species of flowering plant in the family Fabaceae and is endemic to eastern Australia. It is a sparse, erect shrub with long, linear phyllodes, and groups of four to seven yellow flowers with red or purplish markings.

Description

Taxonomy and naming
Daviesia wyattiana was first formally described in 1880 by Frederick Manson Bailey in the journal, The Garden and The Field: A Journal of General Industries, from a specimen he found "growing among rocks at the Eight-mile Plain, a locality to the south of Brisbane". The specific epithet (wyattiana) honours "Dr. Wm. Wyatt, a great promoter of Botany and Horticulture in South Australia".

Distribution
Long-leaf bitter-pea usually grows in forest on rocky ridges and occurs from the central ranges of Queensland to near Coffs Harbour, then disjunctly from the Budawangs in southern New South Wales to the far east of Victoria.

References

wyattiana
Flora of New South Wales
Flora of Victoria (Australia)
Flora of Queensland
Plants described in 1880
Taxa named by Frederick Manson Bailey